Petersham, an electoral district of the Legislative Assembly in the Australian state of New South Wales, has had two incarnations, the first from 1894 to 1920, the second from 1930 to 1941.


Election results

Elections in the 1930s

1938

1935

1932

1930

1920 - 1930
District abolished

Elections in the 1910s

1919 by-election

1917

1913

1910

Elections in the 1900s

1907

1904

1901

Elections in the 1890s

1898

1895

1894

Notes

References

New South Wales state electoral results by district